The 2020 AIR Awards was the fourteenth annual Australian Independent Record Labels Association Music Awards ceremony (generally known as the AIR Awards). It took place on 1 October 2020 in Adelaide.

The nominations were revealed on 7 July 2020, consisting of sixteen categories, up four from twelve, as was the case in 2019. The four new categories were: Best Independent Pop Album or EP, Best Independent Rock Album or EP, Best Independent Children's Album or EP, and Best Independent Soul/R&B Album or EP. The award for Best Independent Hard Rock, Heavy or Punk Album was split in two, recognising Punk and Heavy separately. For the first time, the ceremony didn't include the Best Independent Artist category.

Performers
 Stella Donnelly
 The Teskey Brothers
 Angie McMahon
 The Soul Movers

Nominees and winners

AIR Awards
Winners are listed first and highlighted in boldface; other final nominees are listed alphabetically.

See also
 Music of Australia

References

2020 in Australian music
2020 music awards
AIR Awards